This is an incomplete, chronological list of films produced in the Khmer language between 1990 and 1999.

At least 15 years of film producing were lost in Cambodia due to the Khmer Rouge. At this time, Khmer people in Cambodia preferred Thai dubbed series than watching Khmer movies, but Khmer out of the country only watched Khmer movies then to remind them of their country.

See also
List of Khmer entertainment companies
List of Khmer film actors
List of Khmer film directors

External links
Films from Cambodia at the Internet Movie Database
Khmer-language films at the Internet Movie Database
Filmography of Norodom Sihanouk

1990s
Films
Cambodian